Inviolet Row is an indie rock band from Las Vegas, Nevada. Formed in 2001 by Lee Scrivner, Casey Johnson, Kevin Brewer, and Abe Millet, the band released the albums Consolation Prizes (2002) and Nevertheless (2005), and continues to write new material.

Founding
Inviolet Row was founded by Lee Scrivner (guitar and vocals), Kevin Brewer (guitar), Casey Johnson (bass) and Abe Millet (drums) in Las Vegas, Nevada in 2001. Early that year they began writing and recording songs for what was to become their debut album, Consolation Prizes. Millett left the band while the album was being mixed to devote more time to other projects, eventually joining Third Eye Blind in 2008. The mixing and recording of their debut took over a year because of personnel changes and technical glitches, and during this time Ronnie Vannucci Jr. briefly sat in as a replacement drummer, just weeks before joining The Killers.

Consolation Prizes
Consolation Prizes was released in 2002 to largely positive reviews. The Las Vegas Weekly compared the band to The Psychedelic Furs, and another review drew positive comparisons to The Church and Radiohead, saying "Front man Lee Scrivner's lyrics are just as lovely and often as obscure as those of Steve Kilbey, the Church's lead singer and bassist." The Big Takeover likened Scrivner's singing to that of Sunny Day Real Estate frontman Jeremy Enigk. Paul Sinnott, formerly of the English rock band Family of Free Love, joined as permanent drummer after the album's release.

"Orange Horns," a track from Consolation Prizes,  was featured in Magnet's New Music Sampler (2003).

Nevertheless
A second studio album, Nevertheless, was released in the summer of 2005. To record the album, the band tried unconventional recording approaches, such as putting microphones in a clothes dryer and recording a variety of drum pedal squeaks and reverberating sliding glass doors. Besides the usual rock ensemble, the recordings also used a back-masked 19th century psaltery.

Scrivner relocated to London after the release of Nevertheless to pursue a doctorate at the University of London, but the band continues to write and record material for a forthcoming album in a Las Vegas studio.

Band members
Current members
Lee Scrivner - vocals and guitar
Kevin Brewer - guitar
Casey Johnson - multi-instrumentalist
Paul Sinnott - drums

Former members
Abe Millett - bass
Ryan McIlvaine - guitar
Jack Cowell - guitar
Samuel Daniel - keyboard
Jason Handleman - drums
Ronnie Vannucci Jr. - drums

Discography
Consolation Prizes (2002)
Nevertheless (2005)

References

External links

Indie rock musical groups from Nevada